Amazing Facts is a non-profit Seventh-day Adventist evangelistic ministry based in Granite Bay, California, which broadcasts daily television programming worldwide. It is based on the teachings of Scripture, and especially focuses on the Three Angels' Messages of Revelation 14. Beginning as a radio program dedicated to Christian evangelism, it later expanded into television and online Bible study ministries.

History
Amazing Facts was founded in 1965 by Joe Crews in Baltimore, Maryland. Inspired by the success of The Rest Of The Story, hosted by Paul Harvey, Joe Crews' original objective for Amazing Facts was to reach out to both Christian and non-Christian listeners via daily 15-minute programs by opening with a scientific or historic fact, and how it applies to the overall Biblical messages.  Later, the program offered accompanying home Bible study courses, as well as books written by Crews himself. In 1987, Amazing Facts initiated a television ministry that has expanded to four programs as well as periodic evangelism series.

Shortly before his death in 1994, Crews invited Doug Batchelor to assume the position of president, which he holds to this day. Today, the Amazing Facts radio program "Bible Answers Live" broadcasts mainly out of Granite Bay, California each Sunday evening to about 100 national stations. At the end of 2018, Amazing Facts became an independent ministry and changed its name to Amazing Facts International.

Media programming
Amazing Facts programming is available on a variety of over-the-air, cable and satellite stations
In addition, programs are archived on the website.

Radio programs
 Bible Answers Live - a 60-minute Sunday evening radio program where listeners phone or email Bible questions which are answered live
 Wonders in the Word - 30-minute radio program airing Monday through Thursday

Television
The ministry carries various programming on television through Internet, mobile devices, various television stations, networks including their Amazing Facts Television Channel.

Speakers

AFCOE
Amazing Facts operates the Amazing Facts Center of Evangelism (AFCOE).  "AFCOE trains and equips clergy and lay people in all aspects of evangelistic ministry." Both a four-month "Complete" course and a 4-day "AFCOE To Go" courses are offered from their campus in Rocklin, CA and by request around the world.

Bible school
Amazing Facts offers a free Bible school with online study guides.

Mergers
In April 2007 it was announced that Amazing Facts and 3ABN would be merging 
However, in August 2007, after several months of review, Amazing Facts announced they will not merge with 3ABN due to issues with structural dynamics.

On April 6, 2008 Amazing Facts announced a joint venture with Weimar Institute whereby the operations of Weimar Institute will be administered by Amazing Facts and both organizations would have a single board of directors.
Weimar was renamed Weimar Center of Health and Education and Neil Nedley was chosen as president.

See also

 List of United States cable and satellite television networks
 Religious broadcasting

References

External links
Amazing Facts
Amazing Facts Indonesia

American Christian radio programs
Television series about Christianity
Independent ministries of the Seventh-day Adventist Church
Religious television stations in the United States
Independent television stations in the United States
Christianity in the United States
Christian television networks
Television networks in the United States
Conservative media in the United States
Adventist organizations established in the 20th century